"So Into You" is the second single from the album The Wildhearts Must Be Destroyed by The Wildhearts. It peaked at #22 on the UK Singles Chart.

Track listing
CD1:
So Into You (Gordon Raphael mix)
Dancin'
Lake Of Piss

CD2:
So Into You (Spike Drake mix)
Action Panzer
The People That Life Forgot

7" Red Vinyl: 
So Into You (Spike Drake mix)
Dancin' (instrumental version)
Return To Zero

References

The Wildhearts songs
2003 songs